Rikio (written: 力夫 or 力雄) is a masculine Japanese given name. Notable people with the name include:

, Japanese bobsledder
, Japanese Nordic combined skier

See also
, Japanese professional wrestler

Japanese masculine given names